The Abbeville Southern Railway was incorporated in Alabama in September 1892 for the purpose of building a branch line from a connection with the Alabama Midland Railway at Grimes, Alabama towards Abbeville, Alabama. The route was completed in December 1893, totaling , and was operated by the Alabama Midland Railway.

Defunct Alabama railroads
Predecessors of the Atlantic Coast Line Railroad
Railway companies established in 1892
Railway companies disestablished in 1893